Annabel Lyon (born 1971) is a Canadian novelist and short-story writer. She has published two collections of short fiction, two young adult novels, and two adult historical novels, The Golden Mean and its sequel, The Sweet Girl.

Life and work
Lyon was born in Brampton, Ontario, north-west of Toronto, but moved to Coquitlam, British Columbia, when she was a year old. She completed her Bachelor of Arts in Philosophy at Simon Fraser University and an MFA in Creative Writing at the University of British Columbia. In addition, she attended the University of British Columbia's Faculty of Law for one year.

Lyon published her first book, Oxygen, a collection of stories, in 2000. The Best Thing for You, a collection of three novellas, followed in 2004 and was nominated for the Ethel Wilson Fiction Prize.

Her first novel, The Golden Mean, which imagines the relationship between Alexander the Great and his teacher, Aristotle, was published in 2009. It held the distinction of being the only book nominated that year for all three of Canada's major fiction prizes: the Scotiabank Giller Prize, the Governor General's Award for English-language fiction and the Rogers Writers' Trust Fiction Prize. Of the three, she won the Rogers Prize. The book has been translated into six languages. A sequel, The Sweet Girl, which explores the life of Aristotle's daughter, Pythias, was published in September 2012.

Her novel Consent was longlisted for the Giller Prize in 2020.

She lives in New Westminster, British Columbia, one of 13 cities in Metro Vancouver.

Bibliography

Short fiction
 Oxygen (2000) McClelland & Stewart
 The Best Thing for You (2004) McClelland & Stewart
 Saturday Night Function (2004) Biblioasis
 Imagining ancient women. 2012. Henry Kreisel Memorial Lecture Series, University of Alberta Press

Novels
All-Season Edie (2009) Orca Book Publishers 
The Golden Mean (2009) Random House Canada 
Encore Edie (2010) Puffin Canada
The Sweet Girl (2012) Random House Canada 
Consent (2020)

References

1971 births
21st-century Canadian novelists
Canadian women novelists
Living people
People from Brampton
Writers from Ontario
People from Coquitlam
Writers from British Columbia
Canadian women short story writers
21st-century Canadian women writers
21st-century Canadian short story writers